The Copa Petrobras Colombia is a tennis tournament held in Bogotá, Colombia since 2004. The event is part of the ''challenger series and is played on outdoor clay courts.

Past finals

Singles

Doubles

External links 
 
ITF search

ATP Challenger Tour
Tennis tournaments in Colombia
Clay court tennis tournaments
Copa Petrobras Bogotá